Yuliya Rytsikava (born September 8, 1986) is a Belarusian basketball player. She represented Belarus in the basketball competition at the 2016 Summer Olympics.

References

1986 births
Living people
Belarusian women's basketball players
Olympic basketball players of Belarus
Basketball players at the 2016 Summer Olympics
Shooting guards
People from Smarhon’
Sportspeople from Grodno Region